The Rockford Files is an American detective drama television series starring James Garner that aired on the NBC network from September 13, 1974, to January 10, 1980. Garner portrays Los Angeles private investigator Jim Rockford, with Noah Beery Jr. in the supporting role of his father, Joseph "Rocky" Rockford, a retired truck driver. The show was created by Roy Huggins and Stephen J. Cannell. Huggins had created the television show Maverick (1957–1962), which starred Garner, and he wanted to create a similar show in a modern-day detective setting. In 2002, The Rockford Files was ranked No. 39 on TV Guides 50 Greatest TV Shows of All Time.

Premise

Producers Roy Huggins and Stephen J. Cannell devised the Rockford character as a departure from typical television detectives, essentially Bret Maverick as a modern detective.

In the series storyline, James Scott "Jim" Rockford had served time in California's San Quentin Prison in the 1960s due to a wrongful conviction. After five years, he was pardoned (not paroled, a distinction frequently mentioned in plot points). His jobs as a private investigator barely allow him to maintain his weathered mobile home (which doubles as his office) in a parking lot on a beach in Malibu, California.

In early episodes of the first season, Rockford's trailer is located in a parking lot alongside the highway at 2354 Beach Boulevard (Pacific Coast Highway), Malibu, and near the ocean; for the rest of the series, the trailer is at Paradise Cove (address 29 Cove Road), adjacent to a pier and a restaurant ("The Sand Castle", now known as the "Paradise Cove Beach Cafe").

In the television movies from 1994 to 1999, Rockford is still living and working at the same Paradise Cove location, but in a much newer trailer that has been extensively enlarged and remodeled.

In contrast to sharp-dressed, pugnacious television private eyes of the time, Rockford wears casual, off-the-rack clothing and avoids physical altercations.  He can hold his own in a one-on-one fistfight, but is frequently overpowered when ambushed or outnumbered.

He rarely carries his Colt Detective Special revolver, for which he has no permit, and prefers to talk his way out of trouble. He works on cold cases, missing persons investigations, and low-budget insurance scams, repeatedly stating that he does not handle "open cases" to avoid trouble with the police. (This self-imposed rule was relaxed in later seasons, after "trouble with the police" became a frequent plot device.)

Rockford has been a private investigator since 1968–69, and his fee, when he can collect it, is $200 per day plus expenses ($200 at the series' beginning in September 1974 was the inflation-adjusted equivalent of $ in ).

Cast
Listed in the opening credits:
James Garner as Jim Rockford
Noah Beery Jr. as Joseph "Rocky" Rockford, Jim's father, a retired truck driver. (The role was played by actor Robert Donley in the 1974 pilot episode.)
Joe Santos as Sergeant Dennis Becker, Jim's friend on the Los Angeles Police Department; he was promoted to lieutenant in season five.

Frequently recurring cast:
Stuart Margolin as Evelyn "Angel" Martin, Jim's former prison friend. Angel is an untrustworthy, pathologically lying con artist whose schemes constantly get Jim in trouble, yet Jim remains his friend.
Gretchen Corbett as Elizabeth "Beth" Davenport, Jim's lawyer and sometime girlfriend (seasons 1–4).
James Luisi as Lieutenant Douglas J. "Doug" Chapman (seasons three–six), Becker's superior officer (until Becker's promotion). He and Rockford despise each other, although in later episodes Chapman grudgingly acknowledges Rockford's street smarts.
Tom Atkins as Lieutenant Alex/Thomas Diehl, Becker's superior officer (seasons one-two and four) who also has an antagonistic relationship with Rockford.

Seen in multiple episodes:
Pat Finley as Peggy Becker, Sergeant Becker's wife (6 episodes).
Isaac Hayes as Gandolph "Gandy" Fitch, a brutal, violent acquaintance of Rockford from his prison days. He almost always calls Jim "Rockfish". Jim helps prove Fitch did not commit the crime for which he was imprisoned. The two become friendly. In later episodes Fitch tags along with an unscrupulous investigator Marcus Hayes (Louis Gossett Jr.) trying to cash in on one of Rockford's cases; and needs Jim's help dealing with mobsters connected to the ex-husband of his new girlfriend (played by Dionne Warwick). Jim remains on good terms with Fitch, towards whom he seems to display an almost naive blind spot despite Fitch's refusal to ever take Jim's "no" for an answer, and his lack of compunction about using violence, including occasionally on a recalcitrant Jim himself (three episodes).
Bo Hopkins as John "Coop" Cooper, Jim's disbarred attorney friend in Season five (four episodes).
Tom Selleck as Lance White, a successful and glamorous private investigator with an uncynical approach to the business. Liked and admired by everyone, Jim is a bit jealous of Lance and considers him naive, lucky and likely to cause others to get hurt (2 episodes). According to Stephen J. Cannell's meticulous Archive of American Television interview, Lance White was based on "Waco Williams", a similarly-polished character in Maverick appearing in the episode "The Saga of Waco Williams". Williams was portrayed in Maverick by Wayde Preston, who in 1958 resembled Tom Selleck two decades later.
Dennis Dugan as Richie Brockelman, a young, idealistic and seemingly naive private investigator who seeks Jim's help from time to time. Bereft of Jim's cynicism and physical toughness, Richie is nevertheless a sharp operator who used his outwardly trusting 'gee whiz' persona to mask his dogged cleverness. This character was initially introduced in the short-lived Richie Brockelman, Private Eye (two two-part episodes). 
Kathryn Harrold as Dr. Megan Dougherty, a blind psychiatrist who hires Jim. Their relationship eventually blossoms into a romance.  Jim is upset in a later episode to learn that she has become engaged to another man (two episodes).
Simon Oakland as Vern St. Cloud, a blustery, arrogant, and often untrustworthy fellow private investigator. St. Cloud and Rockford grudgingly accept each other's assistance from time to time, trading insults along the way (Oakland appeared in a sixth-season episode playing an unrelated character, three episodes).
Louis Gossett Jr. as Marcus Aurelius "Gabby" Hayes, an impeccably dressed, chauffeur-driven, boastful P.I. who is nearly always on a hustle, usually to Rockford's misfortune.  Gossett appeared first in Foul on the First Play wearing a full wig with sideburns, appearing the following season in Just Another Polish Wedding without it (two episodes).
Rita Moreno as Rita Capkovic, a call girl and occasional police informant who is targeted by a millionaire businessman because of her friendship with an elderly widow. In later episodes she gets accused of the murder of a client; and when she tries to leave her profession and hides out with Rockford it enrages her sadistic former pimp. It is never made explicit if Jim and Rita are ever romantically involved, beyond their close friendship (three episodes).
 James Whitmore Jr. as Fred Beamer, an auto mechanic who aspires to be a Private Investigator, and involves himself in Jim's affairs.  In his first appearance, Beamer assumed Jim's identity, living in his trailer, making numerous purchases on credit for detection equipment of questionable efficacy, driving (and heavily damaging) his Firebird, and taking on clients, plunging Jim into trouble. (Whitmore later directed the T.V. movie The Rockford Files:  I Still Love L.A.) (two episodes).
Al Stevenson as L.J., a friend of Rocky's, who often performs odd jobs for Rocky and Jim (in one episode, Jim discovers him alone at Rocky's house repairing a shower faucet).  L.J. is closer to Jim's age than Rocky's, and it is likely they met during the latter's career as a trucker (four episodes).
Luis Delgado as Officer Todd Billings, seen frequently at the precinct or at crime scenes.  Delgado played a number of other bit roles in early Rockford seasons before settling into the recurring minor role of Billings starting in season 3.  Delgado was the brother-in-law of series co-creator Roy Huggins, and James Garner's long-time stand-in.
Bucklind Beery as Officer Al Mazursky, another recurring bit-part officer very occasionally seen at the precinct during seasons two-five.  Bucklind Beery is the son of Noah Beery.
Hunter von Leer (credited as Hunter Von Leer) as Skip Spence, a libidinous, money-seeking lifeguard stationed on the beach near Jim's trailer. Jim finds Skip distasteful, but Skip occasionally provides information helpful to him. In one episode Skip gives information to gangsters searching for Jim (two episodes).
Jack Garner (James Garner's real-life brother) was seen in numerous bit parts including a policeman, a gas station attendant, and a stranger in a bathroom.  He then assumed the role of the fence-sitting, ineffectual Captain McEnroe (Becker's superior officer) in season six.
Sharon Spelman as Doris Parker a wealthy widow who hired Rockford to investigate the suspicious death of her husband in "Profit and Loss" episodes 1&2 and as public defender Karen Hathaway in "The Deuce".

Supporting characters
Dennis Becker:  Rockford's pursuit of cases often leads to difficulties with his friend in the LAPD, Sgt. Dennis Becker (Joe Santos), a homicide detective struggling to advance in the department under a series of overbearing lieutenants. The two most notable are Alex/Thomas Diehl (Tom Atkins) during the first, second and fourth seasons and Doug Chapman (James Luisi) in the third to sixth seasons. Those higher-ups invariably dislike Rockford (and private investigators generally) because of their perception that either he is meddling in open cases or is trying to make the LAPD look incompetent in its handling of closed cases. Further, Rockford often calls Becker asking for favors, such as running license plates through the California Department of Motor Vehicles (DMV) computer system, often annoying the already overworked cop. By the fifth season, Becker is promoted to lieutenant; it was stated in the episode where Becker is promoted that Becker's association with Rockford, considered by LAPD brass to be a shifty ex-con, had hampered Becker's chances for promotion. Chapman was irritated when Becker became his "equal". In season 6 episode The Big Cheese, the third-to-last of the series, Rockford gets a degree of revenge when Chapman inadvertently makes incriminating statements about his tax evasion before an undercover IRS agent who is with Rockford.  Becker appears in 89 of the 123 episodes.

Joseph "Rocky" Rockford:  Rockford's father, Joseph "Rocky" Rockford, is an ex-Seabee, semi-retired, semi-truck driver who nags his son to find stable (and less dangerous) employment, often urging him to follow in his footsteps as a truck driver (especially in early seasons), and often wishing Jim would get married. The relationship of father and son was an integral part of the show. Rocky appears in 101 episodes, and usually becomes involved (like it or not) in his son's cases. Occasionally, he hires Jim himself. Jim Rockford's mother is never shown or named, and is very seldom referred to. Although never directly stated, the way Jim and Rocky talk about her would seem to indicate she had died (before the series' start).

Rocky was portrayed by Noah Beery Jr. except in the 1974 pilot film, where he was portrayed by Robert Donley. Although much of the character's backstory is the same, in the pilot Rocky is portrayed as more of a small-time grifter and operator — at one point, working with a partner, Rocky unsuccessfully tries to run a minor scam on Jim, his own son.  This element of Rocky's character would largely be dropped as the series started.  Beery's version of Rocky was generally honest and reliable, though not above working an unreported job 'under the table' to supplement his pension income, or eating the most expensive food in Jim's fridge if he dropped by while Jim was out.

Beth Davenport:  Rockford has a close relationship with his attorney, the idealistic, tenacious Elizabeth "Beth" Davenport (Gretchen Corbett). In second-season episode "A Portrait of Elizabeth", it is explained that Beth and Rockford had dated for a time (prior to the beginning of the series), but she soon became aware of his emotional unavailability and lack of interest in a longterm relationship, and realized that they'd be better off as friends (although the two do seem to still casually date and sleep together on occasion during early seasons).

Angel Martin:  Rockford's scheming former San Quentin cellmate, Evelyn "Angel" Martin was something of a comic relief character played by Stuart Margolin.  Jim employs Angel as an operative from time to time, often to gather street-level information, or to help him access the files of the newspaper where Angel works as a low-level filing clerk. Keeping this job is a condition of Angel's parole; even so, it's doubtful that the ever-shifty Angel would be capable of doing so, except that his brother-in-law owns the paper. Jim also uses Angel on a few occasions to play a supporting role in the elaborate con games that he sets up to sting especially difficult adversaries.

Angel is himself forever running some sort of (usually very bottom-of-the-barrel) con game, and is consistently ready to sell anyone out at a moment's notice for his own benefit — and often does. In doing so, Angel almost always gets Rockford in trouble, usually by involving him in hare-brained scams ... often without Jim's knowledge, and never with his consent.  As often as not, Angel's antics result in Angel's, Jim's and/or others' arrests, and/or being placed on somebody's hit list.  In spite of this, Jim considers Angel as one of his best, if most exasperating, pals. Towards the very end of the series, there is a noticeable cooling in Jim's attitude toward Angel in their often fractious relationship; however, the rift seems to have been repaired by the time of the reunion movies.

Others:
After Corbett was dropped from the show following the fourth season (allegedly due to contract disputes between Universal, which owned her contract, and Cherokee Productions, Garner's company), John Cooper, a disbarred attorney, was added as a new adviser for the frequent legal problems in which Rockford would become entangled. A new romantic interest, Dr. Megan Dougherty (Kathryn Harrold), a blind but highly independent psychiatrist, appeared for two episodes in Seasons Five and Six.

Credits

Writers
The show's pilot was written by Cannell, who also wrote 36 episodes and was the show's co-creator. Juanita Bartlett, one of the show's producers and Garner's partner at Cherokee Productions, wrote 34 episodes. She also wrote for Scarecrow and Mrs. King, The Greatest American Hero, and In the Heat of the Night. David Chase wrote 16 episodes; he later went on to Northern Exposure and The Sopranos. The show's co-creator, Roy Huggins, also wrote for the show during the first season, always using pen name John Thomas James. However, Huggins' contributions to the show ended midway through the first season, after he submitted a script rewrite direct to set as the episode was shooting, without getting approval from any other writer or producer. Garner, trying to work with the material on set, felt the rewrite was unsatisfactory, and could not figure out why it had been approved for shooting. When he discovered that neither Cannell nor any of the other production staff members knew anything about the rewrite, Garner issued a directive that Cannell, not Huggins, had final say on all script material. Though Huggins was credited as a producer for the entire run of the series, this effectively ended his creative involvement with the show, as he submitted no further material to The Rockford Files and did not involve himself in the day-to-day running of the series.

Directors

Frequent directors included William Wiard (23 episodes), Lawrence Doheny (10 episodes), and Ivan Dixon (previously a regular on Hogan's Heroes) (nine episodes). Veteran actor James Coburn directed an episode. Coburn had co-starred with Garner in the classic movies The Great Escape (1963) and The Americanization of Emily (1964). Other actors who directed episodes include Jackie Cooper (three episodes), as well as Richard Crenna and Dana Elcar (one episode each). Co-creator Stephen J. Cannell directed several episodes; executive producer Meta Rosenberg directed six episodes; series regular Stuart Margolin helmed two; and James Garner directed one episode in the second season, "The Girl in The Bay City Boys' Club". It was Garner's only directing credit in his entire fifty-plus-year film career; in his autobiography, The Garner Files, Garner states he only took on the assignment because the scheduled director was unexpectedly unavailable at the last minute.

Vehicles

Pontiac Firebird Esprit
Familiar to viewers was Jim Rockford's gold Pontiac Firebird Esprit car. One oft-recurring element of the show was the famous "Jim Rockford turn-around" (also known as a J-turn or a "moonshiner's turn" - commonly employed as an evasive driving technique taught to Secret Service). Garner explained the move in his 2011 autobiography The Garner Files: "When you are going straight in reverse about 35 miles an hour, you come off the gas pedal, go hard left, and pull on the emergency brake. That locks the wheels and throws the front end around. Then you release everything, hit the gas, and off you go in the opposite direction." Garner stated in a Season One DVD interview that he performed this stunt for the duration of the series. The car's license plate was 853 OKG, although the plate in some early episodes displayed the number 835 OKG. Garner writes in his autobiography that he believes that the letters OKG stood for "Oklahoma Garner" but that he does not know the origin of the number 853.

Starting with the 1974 model year, Rockford would get a new model-year Pontiac Firebird each year throughout the series. The Firebirds used had an identical "copper mist" color with the Esprit's exterior and interior.  Although the Firebirds were badged as Esprits, they were actually the higher performance "Formula" model without the twin scoop hood. Garner needed Rockford's car to look like the lower tiered "Esprit" model, a car Rockford could afford, but have the performance necessary for the chase sequences in the show. To achieve this, the show featured Pontiac Firebird Formulas re-badged and re-hooded to look like the "Esprit" model. The "Formula" model was developed to provide the performance of the top-level "Trans Am" in a less ostentatious form. Formulas didn't have the Shaker hood scoop, side vents, graphics or lettering used on the Trans Am, but they had the same higher horsepower engines and drive trains, larger front and rear anti-roll bars, stiffer springs and shocks, and a twin scoop hood. (Sharp-eyed car connoisseurs can spot the twin exhausts and rear anti-roll bar on the cars used on the show, options that were not part of the "Esprit" package, as well as spot the different model year cars used in various chase scenes that differed from those in an actual episode, especially in later seasons.) Although the series ran until early 1980, no Firebird was used past the 1978 model year as Garner reportedly was displeased with the restyled front end of the 1979 and later Firebird models and as such did not wish them featured on the show (although an answering machine message in one episode in the final season indicated his car was a 1979 Firebird).

In the first TV movie, I Still Love L.A. in 1994, the Firebird is shown, in ramshackle disrepair, parked next to Rockford's trailer. He mentions he plans to have it "fixed up," but drives other cars throughout the films.

GMC Sierra Classic pickup
Joseph "Rocky" Rockford drove a GMC Sierra Classic pickup truck throughout the series. In the course of the storylines Jim often borrowed Rocky's truck when his own Firebird was being repaired from its frequent major damage sustained during cases, or was too "hot" (i.e., the LAPD, which knew Jim well, was seeking to bring him in).

Rocky's truck had a 400-cubic-inch engine, Turbo 400 automatic transmission, and a four-wheel drive factory setup. The custom exterior paint was silver with maroon panels and orange pinstriping. Additionally, the truck sported various after-market accessories added by noted California customizer and off-road racer, Vic Hickey, including the winch, brush guard, hubcap covers, sidestep bed plates, auxiliary gas tanks, custom steering wheel, rear roll bar, Cibié headlamps mounted on the front bumper/rear roll bar, and Pace CB radio. In several Season 5-6 episodes, Rocky drives a candy-apple red 1980 GMC C-10 Short Box pickup when his original vehicle is said to be in the shop for repair of damage from one of Jim's earlier adventures.

Other cars 
Beth Davenport drove a yellow 1973 Porsche 914 in Season 1, before switching to an orange 1975 model in Season 2 (though in episode 202, "The Farnsworth Stratagem" she drove a 1972 Audi 100 C1) and using it through the first half of Season 3, last appearance in episode 311, "The Trouble With Warren". In Season 3, she switched to a Mercedes-Benz 450SL. Police cars used during the series were usually the 1972-1973 AMC Matador, in real-life use by the LAPD during the 1970s. From the third season, the 1974 second-series, "coffin nose" Matador was also used, which was also the last AMC model used by California law enforcement agencies.

Theme song
The show's theme song titled "The Rockford Files" was written by noted theme music composers Mike Post and Pete Carpenter. It appears at the opening and ending of each episode with different arrangements. Throughout the show's tenure, the theme song went through numerous evolutions with later versions containing a distinct electric guitar-based bridge section played by session guitarist Dan Ferguson. The theme for #1.7 "This Case Is Closed II", also has the guitar section from later seasons, added when the episode was split into two parts for syndication.

The theme song was released as a single and spent two weeks at No. 10 on the Billboard Hot 100, in August 1975. The B-side track (or "flip-side") titled "Dixie Lullabye" was also composed by Post and Carpenter. The single remained on the chart for 16 weeks and won a 1975 Grammy Award for Best Instrumental Arrangement. In Canada, the song reached No. 8, and was No. 84 in the year-end chart.

For more than forty years, the British football team Tranmere Rovers have used the Rockford theme as walk-out music for most games.  Occasionally it has been dropped, and then restored by popular demand.

Answering machine introductions
Each episode began with the image of Rockford's answering machine, and the opening title sequence was accompanied by a message on a Dictaphone remote Ansafone 660. As the camera focuses on the telephone, whose number is 555-2368, it rings twice and then Rockford's recorded voice is heard providing the following greeting:

The messages were usually unrelated to the current episode, but were often related to previous events in earlier episodes. They were a humorous device that invited the viewer to return to the quirky, down-on-his-luck world of Jim Rockford. The messages usually had to do with creditors, deadbeat clients, or were just oddball vignettes. Though a distinctive and clever entry device, the messages became difficult for the writers to create. Suggestions from staffers and crew were welcome and often used.

In total, 122 different messages were created through the run of the original six seasons. The eight CBS TV movies (also referred to as season 8) feature a unique message.  However episodes syndicated as James Rockford, Private Investigator use the same message; it was taken from episode 5-07, "A Three-Day Affair with a Thirty-Day Escrow".

Each message is a standalone gag that often provides a small amount of biographical detail about Rockford, the people he knows and the activities that occur in his life as a private investigator. Only extremely rarely (such as in episode No. 2-09, "Chicken Little is a Little Chicken", during which Rockford house- and cat-sits for an absent Beth) is the content of the answering machine message in any way connected to the plot or situations of the episode itself.

In "Guilt" although not connected to the plot it does get referenced during the opening scene. The recorded message is Angel giving a racing tip and when Jim gets back to the trailer he plays back another message from Angel asking why Jim ignored the tip.

End
The show went into hiatus late in 1979 when Garner was told by his doctors to recuperate from numerous knee injuries and back trouble, as well as an ulcer. He sustained the former conditions largely because of the daily grind of an extremely physically demanding show, performing most of his own stunts for realism, especially those involving fist fights or car chases. Because of the toll on his body, Garner was ordered by his doctor to immediately take time off some months later, and NBC abruptly cancelled the program in mid-season. It was alleged  that Rockford had become very expensive to produce, mainly due to the location filming and use of high-end actors as guest stars. According to sources, NBC and Universal claimed the show was generating a deficit of several million dollars, a staggering amount for a nighttime show at the time, although Garner and his production team Cherokee Productions claimed the show turned a profit. Garner told a story to Johnny Carson on The Tonight Show that the studio once paid a carpenter $700 to build a shipping crate for a shoot-out on a boat dock, though there were shipping crates on the dock. The script often called for Garner to damage his car, so the car could be sold, repaired, and repurchased for each episode.

Aftermath
Later in the 1980s, Garner became engaged in a legal dispute with Universal that lasted more than a decade, regarding the profits from Rockford Files. The dispute caused significant ill will between Garner and the studio. The dispute was settled out of court in Garner's favor, but the conflict meant that the Rockford character would not re-emerge until 1994. Universal began syndicating the show in 1979 and aggressively marketed it to local stations well into the early and mid-1980s. This accounts for its near-ubiquity on afternoon and late-night schedules in those days. From those showings, Rockford developed a following with younger viewers, with the momentum continuing throughout the 1990s and 2000s on cable. (The Ben Folds Five song "Battle of Who Could Care Less", in which The Rockford Files is mentioned, is one example of the show's newfound youth following; furthermore, the Rockford Files theme song is played at the end of the band's concerts.)

By 1989, the show had grossed  from network and syndicated runs.

In 2006, the show was broadcast for a few months on the national Chicago Superstation WGN. In 2007, the Retro Television Network began broadcasting the program nationwide, as did the digital cable channel Sleuth and Chicago TV station WWME-CA. ION Television has rights to the show and it is slated for future broadcast. In the fall of 2009, the show reappeared in Canada on Deja View. The series was broadcast in the UK on BBC1 and has since been repeated on BBC2 and ITV and also on Granada +Plus, which later became ITV3, although none of these channels repeated the later seasons. In Australia, the series runs Monday - Friday on cable and satellite channel Fox Classics and on 7Mate. The series aired in the United States on the MeTV digital subchannel network until September 2, 2016, the series was available on Netflix until January 1, 2017, with the first three seasons available on Hulu Plus. From 2016 to 2020, the series was available on IMDb TV. In late 2020, it became part of the catalog of the NBCUniversal Peacock (streaming service) but in 2022, moved to Tubi.  The series had aired on Cozi TV.  As of January 3, 2022, the series is airing on GetTV as part of their nightly lineup.

Episodes

The series pilot aired on NBC March 27, 1974, as a 90-minute made-for-television movie. In the pilot, Lindsay Wagner also starred and later made a return appearance. The pilot was titled Backlash of the Hunter for syndication.

TV movies
After several long-running contractual disputes between Garner and Universal were resolved, eight Rockford Files reunion TV movies were made from 1994 to 1999, airing on the CBS network (whereas the original series aired on NBC) and reuniting most of the cast from the original show. Beery died on November 1, 1994, so the first of these films, which aired later that month, stated, "This picture is dedicated to the memory of Noah Beery, Jr. We love you and miss you, Pidge." ("Pidge" was Beery's nickname.)

The movies picked up nearly 15 years later from where the show ended. In the initial movies, Rocky is referenced as alive, but is off-screen; he dies (within the series continuity) sometime before the third movie.

Garner, Santos, and Margolin appear in every movie. Other Rockford regulars who appear in multiple movies include Luisi, Atkins, Corbett, and Jack Garner (as Capt. McEnroe). Recurring players from the series who are brought back for a single return appearance include Rita Moreno (as Rita Kapkovic); Kathryn Harrold (as Megan Daugherty); and Pat Finley (as Peggy Becker).

Also added to the cast (i.e., appearing only in the movies and in small, recurring roles) were Gerry Gibson as 'Critch' Critchland, the owner of the Sandcastle restaurant across from Jim's trailer; and Shirley Anthony as Sally, a friendly, cheerful grandmotherly type who frequented the precinct to (falsely) confess to crimes, and to knit sweaters while she waited. Anthony had previously been a frequent extra and occasional bit part player on The Rockford Files from 1976 to 1979.

Spinoffs
The series Richie Brockelman, Private Eye was a spin-off of The Rockford Files. The character of Richie Brockelman, played by Dennis Dugan, was originally created for a 1976 TV movie intended as a series pilot produced by Cannell, but NBC did not pickup the series nor air the pilot movie. However, Cannell introduced the Brockelman character in the 1978 Rockford Files episode "The House on Willis Avenue", which was broadcast the week before Richie Brockelman, Private Eye began its five-week trial run in The Rockford Files time slot. The series was not renewed behind that limited run, but the Brockelman character returned in the 1979 Rockford Files episode "Never Send a Boy King To Do a Man's Job".
Universal made a back door pilot featuring the characters Gandolph "Gandy" Fitch and Marcus "Gabby" Hayes (played by Isaac Hayes and Lou Gossett Jr., respectively) in the episode titled "Just Another Polish Wedding". The intention was to spin this out into a series called Gabby & Gandy, but the series never came to fruition.
A second back door pilot was made for a series that would have featured Greg Antonacci and Gene Davis as Eugene Conigliaro and Mickey Long, two humorously incompetent characters who were introduced in the episode "The Jersey Bounce". The series pilot involved them trying to ingratiate their way into the New Jersey mob and aired as "Just a Coupla Guys", the next-to-last episode of The Rockford Files. David Chase, who wrote both episodes, would later create The Sopranos, which centered on the New Jersey mob. Greg Antonacci, who had played Conigliaro, played a role as an underboss of a rival family to the Sopranos.

Production 
The show was created by Roy Huggins and Stephen J. Cannell. Huggins had created, written for and produced Garner's breakthrough series Maverick in 1957 and envisioned The Rockford Files as presenting a similar character as a modern private investigator rather than a gambler in the American Old West. Huggins teamed with Cannell, who had written for Jack Webb's Mark VII Productions such as Adam-12 and Chase (1973–1974, NBC), to create The Rockford Files. The show was credited as "A Public Arts/Roy Huggins Production" along with Cherokee Productions in association with Universal Television. Cherokee was owned by Garner, with partners Meta Rosenberg and Juanita Bartlett, who doubled as story editor during most of The Rockford Files run.

Ratings

Awards
Golden Globe Awards

Primetime Emmy Awards

Writers Guild of America Awards

Other Awards

Home media

DVD
Universal Studios has released all six seasons of The Rockford Files on DVD in Region 1. On November 3, 2009, they released The Rockford Files- Movie Collection, Volume 1, featuring the first four post-series telefilms. On May 26, 2015, they released The Movie Collection, Volume 2, five-and-a-half years after the release of volume 1. They also released a 34-disc complete series collection on the same day.

On April 18, 2016, it was announced that Mill Creek Entertainment had acquired the rights to the series; they subsequently re-released the first two seasons on DVD in Region 1 on July 5, 2016. On June 13, 2017, Mill Creek re-released The Rockford Files: The Complete Series on DVD and also released the complete series on Blu-ray for the first time ever. This series is on NBCUniversal's Peacock streaming service.

Universal Playback has released the first 5 seasons on DVD in Region 2. The pilot for The Rockford Files is in the season 2 set.

Blu-ray
On June 27, 2017, Mill Creek Entertainment released The Rockford Files: The Complete Series on Blu-ray in Region A for the very first time.

Remakes
In 2009, NBC, Universal Media Studios and Steve Carell's Carousel Television produced a revival of the show. David Shore, creator of House, was hired to head the series. In February 2010, it was announced that Dermot Mulroney was cast as Jim Rockford, Alan Tudyk cast as Det. Dennis Becker, Melissa Sagemiller was cast as Beth Davenport, and Beau Bridges was cast as Rocky. A pilot was filmed but never broadcast. Early audiences indicated that the pilot was not directed well. On May 13, 2010, the Rockford Files remake was scrapped by NBC.

A feature adaptation was in production by Universal Pictures as of 2012, with Vince Vaughn associated with the project as producer and star. After the death of actor James Garner in 2014, the film adaptation was postponed, but Vaughn in 2012 was hoping to get the film project made.

References

External links

That Eric Alper - You can now download Jim Rockford’s Answering Machine Messages
IMDb:
Original: 
2010: 

 
American detective television series
1974 American television series debuts
1980 American television series endings
1970s American crime drama television series
1980s American crime drama television series
1970s American mystery television series
1980s American mystery television series
English-language television shows
Fictional portrayals of the Los Angeles Police Department
NBC original programming
Primetime Emmy Award for Outstanding Drama Series winners
Television shows set in Los Angeles
Television shows filmed in Los Angeles
Television series by Stephen J. Cannell Productions
Television series by Universal Television
Television series created by Roy Huggins
Television series created by Stephen J. Cannell